Reginald George Boyle (3 March 1903 – 1 May 1986) was an Australian rules footballer who played with Collingwood in the Victorian Football League (VFL).

Family
The son of John Thomas Boyle (1862-1927), and Georgina Mary Boyle (1868-1913), née Appleton, Reginald George Boyle was born at Collingwood, Victoria on 3 March 1903.

He married Dorothy May Parker Vernon (1908-1990) in 1928.

Football

Collingwood (VFL)
He made his debut for the Collingwood Football Club during the 8th Round in 1925.

Northcote (VFA)
He was cleared from Collingwood to Northcote in May 1927.

Brunswick (VFA)
In April 1928 he was cleared from "N.S.W." to Brunswick.

Notes

References

External links 
 		
 Reg Boyle, at The VFA Project
 Reg Boyle's profile at Collingwood Forever

1903 births
1986 deaths
Australian rules footballers from Melbourne
Collingwood Football Club players
Northcote Football Club players
Brunswick Football Club players
People from Collingwood, Victoria